The Chequers Estate Act 1917 is an Act of the Parliament of the United Kingdom that designates Chequers as the official country residence of the Prime Minister of the United Kingdom. It was given royal assent on 20 December 1917.

The Act was the first piece of legislation to recognise the existence of a Prime Minister even though the head of government had been referred to unofficially as "Prime Minister" since the early 18th century.

References

United Kingdom Acts of Parliament 1917
1917 in law